The rivière aux Écorces du Milieu is a tributary of the rivière aux Écorces, flowing in the unorganized territories of Lac-Jacques-Cartier, the La Côte-de-Beaupré Regional County Municipality, in the administrative region of Capitale-Nationale, in the province from Quebec, to Canada. The course of the Rivière aux Écorces du Milieu crosses the western part of the Laurentides Wildlife Reserve.

The valley of the Rivière aux Écorces du Milieu is served indirectly by the route 169 and directly by the forest road R0261 which goes up the valley of the rivière aux Écorces and the Rivière aux Écorces du Milieu. This valley is also served by some secondary forest roads, especially for forestry and recreational tourism activities.

Forestry is the main economic activity in this valley; recreational tourism, second.

The surface of the Rivière aux Écorces du Milieu is usually frozen from the beginning of December to the end of March, however safe circulation on the ice is generally done from mid-December to mid-March.

Geography 
The main watersheds neighboring the Rivière aux Écorces du Milieu are:
 north side: Lac Frenette, Rivière aux Écorces, Trompeuse River, rivière aux Écorces North-East, Lake Paris;
 east side: Jacqueline Lake, Pikauba River, Pikauba Lake, lac des Pas Perdus;
 south side: Rivière aux Écorces, Emures lake, Gratia stream, Métabetchouane East River;
 west side: rivière aux Écorces, Eugène lake, Corneillier lake, Métascouac River.

The rivière aux Écorces du Milieu rises at Lake Chavigny in a forest area in the Laurentides Wildlife Reserve. This source is located at:
  east of Lake Germain;
  east of Franchère Lake;
  west of the mouth of the head lake of Launière River;
  south-west of the Pikauba River;
  south-west of the junction of route 169 and route 175;
  south-east of the summit of the center of the hamlet Mont-Apica;
  north-east of the confluence of the middle Écorces river and the Écorces river.

Upper course of the rivière aux Écorces du Milieu (segment of )

  southwards crossing Petit Lac Chavigny, up to the outlet (coming from the east) of Lake Zither;
  towards the west by forming a loop towards the south, then a curve towards the north in the marsh zone, and crossing Day Lake over its full length, to its mouth. Note: Day Lake receives the discharge from Lake Germain and Lake Brouillard on the north side;
  towards the southwest crossing for about  the southern part of Lac Franchère, to its mouth;

Middle course of the rivière aux Écorces du Milieu  (segment of )

  to the west by crossing two series of rapids, then by forming a curve towards the north by crossing Lake Arteau formed by a widening of the river, up to the outlet (coming from the south) of Lac Bourget;
  to the west, forming a curve towards the north, bypassing a mountain whose summit reaches , up to Dei stream (coming from the south- East);
  towards the west by forming a loop towards the north around an island, up to Gravel stream (coming from the southeast);
  towards the west by forming a curve towards the north crossing a marsh zone, up to the outlet (coming from the south) of Lac Monette;
  to the west, forming a curve to the north, then a large curve to the south to go around a mountain whose summit reaches , and crossing over a hundred meters the southern part of Lake Sénécal to its mouth;

Lower course of the rivière aux Écorces du Milieu (segment of )

  south-west in a deep valley, up to Chaperon stream (coming from the south-east);
  towards the northwest by forming a curve towards the south, then passing on the northeast side of a mountain whose summit reaches ;
  south-west, up to a bend in the river;
  towards the south by forming a curve towards the west in the marsh zone, forming a loop towards the south, curving towards the west, forming another loop towards the west, then towards the south, to its mouth.

The “rivière aux Écorces du Milieu” flows on the northeast bank of the rivière aux Écorces. This confluence is located at:

  south of Lac Frenette;
  east of the course of the Métascouac River;
  east of Corneillier Lake;
  south-east of lac aux Écorces;
  south-east of the confluence of the Pikauba River and the rivière aux Écorces;
  south-east of the confluence of the Pikauba River and Kenogami Lake;
  south of the confluence of the Chicoutimi River and the Saguenay River in the Chicoutimi sector of the city of Saguenay (city).

Toponymy 
The toponym “Rivière aux Écorces du Milieu” was formalized on December 5, 1968, at the Place Names Bank of the Commission de toponymie du Québec.

See also 

 List of rivers of Quebec

References 

Rivers of Capitale-Nationale
La Côte-de-Beaupré Regional County Municipality